The following television stations broadcast on digital or analog channel 35 in Canada:

 CFJP-DT in Montreal, Quebec
 CFTO-DT-54 in Peterborough, Ontario
 CHCJ-DT in Hamilton, Ontario
 CIIT-DT in Winnipeg, Manitoba
 CIMT-DT-7 in Les Escoumins, Quebec
 CIVK-DT-3 in Gaspé, Quebec
 CKRT-DT-5 in Saint-Urbain, Quebec

35 TV stations in Canada